Hey Dude is an American Western comedy series that aired on Nickelodeon from July 14, 1989, to August 30, 1991, consisting of 65 half-hour episodes produced over five seasons.

The series, aimed primarily towards a teenage audience, is set on the fictional "Bar None Dude Ranch" near the city of Tucson, Arizona. It portrays the lives of the ranch's owner, his son, a female ranch hand, and four teenage summer employees.

Premise
Ben Ernst, a divorced, good-natured, somewhat bumbling father from New Jersey, bought the Bar None Dude Ranch seeking escape from his high-pressure job as a New York City accountant. His son, Buddy, is displeased with the change of environment, primarily because he is unable to use his skateboard on the desert sand.

In Season 1 of the series, the teenage staff consisted of two boys and two girls: Ted, an enterprising troublemaker; Danny, an easy-going Hopi teenager and Ted's best friend; girl-next-door Melody; and Brad, a rich girl from Grosse Pointe, Michigan. Though Brad often wears dressy designer outfits at work, she is a competent horse rider. Her love-hate relationship with Ted is a plot thread during the first half of the series.

After David Lascher left the show during Season 3 in 1990, Ted was replaced by Ernst's nephew Jake, an eccentric slacker who likes to play the drums. Not long after, Kyle, a somewhat dim but handsome cowboy type, joined the ranch. When Ted returned to the show, he and Kyle became romantic rivals for Brad. The show's only other featured adult is Lucy, a tough, authoritative ranch hand. She is sometimes viewed as a mother figure to the teens and often ask her for advice.

Each episode begins with a cold open that usually ends with a pun. After that, the show's logo appears over the end of the cold open. Each character is then introduced as a horseshoe flips, followed again by the show's logo, after which the opening sequence fades out. Each episode ends with an instrumental version of the show's theme song while the credits roll over stills from the episode.

Characters 

 David Brisbin as Benjamin Ernst Sr., a ranch owner who is also a successful accountant in New Jersey.
 Kelly Brown as Bradley "Brad" Taylor, a riding instructor from a rich Grosse Pointe, Michigan family
 Debra Kalman as Lucy, ranch hand foreman and supervisor
 David Lascher as Ted McGriff, senior staff
 Christine Taylor as Melody Hanson, lifeguard and dance instructor from Allentown, Pennsylvania
 Joe Torres as Danny Lightfoot, a Hopi teenager. 
 Geoffrey Coy as Kyle Chandler, Lucy's ex-boyfriend's son
 Jonathan Galkin as Jake Decker, Mr. Ernst's nephew from Los Angeles, California
 Josh Tygiel as Benjamin "Buddy" Ernst Jr., Mr. Ernst's son who is spending the summer with his father in the ranch. 
 Cassie, Buddy's dog, was featured in Season 1, but was absent in Season 2

David Lascher and Joe Torres were nominated for a 1991 Young Artist Award in the Best Youth Variety or Game Show category for their roles on Hey Dude.

Production 
Hey Dude was videotaped on location at the Tanque Verde Guest Ranch in Tucson, Arizona. The show was produced by Cinetel Productions. Casting began in 1988 with local auditions held in Tucson. Josh Tygiel, who was cast as protagonist Buddy Ernst, was one of 120 Tucson-area boys who auditioned for the series. Joe Torres was cast as Danny Lightfoot after auditioning in Tucson for the role.

While most of the show was technically shot on the property of the Tanque Verde Guest Ranch, the familiar "ranch" that was known to television viewers was actually built from scratch roughly a mile away from the main public areas. This was done so ranch guests would not be bothered by the production and to create buildings with a more "western" look, which was not offered by the relatively modern and luxurious Tanque Verde. The main lodge, boys and girls bunks, guest lodge (which doubled as cast dressing rooms) and the stable were all built specifically for the production.

After the show ended production, the buildings were abandoned and several are still standing to this day, albeit in much disrepair. The swimming pool that was frequently used on the show is the main pool for the Tanque Verde Guest Ranch and is still in use by guests.

Episodes
The series ran for 65 30-minute episodes over two years from 1989 to 1991. Each season take place over the course of one summer in the lives of the ranch's staff, with cast members often recalling pranks and staff members from previous summers.

Series overview

Season 1 (1989)

Season 2 (1989–90)

Season 3 (1990)

Season 4 (1990)

Season 5 (1991)

Home media
The first season of Hey Dude became available for download from the iTunes Store on July 29, 2008. The second season of Hey Dude became available for download from the iTunes Store in August 2010. The third season of Hey Dude became available for download from the iTunes Store on November 29, 2011 (only containing 12 out of 13 episodes).  All five seasons of the series are available for purchase as DVD or streaming episodes through Amazon.com.

On April 11, 2011, it was announced that Shout! Factory had acquired the rights to the series. They subsequently released the entire series on DVD in Region 1. The fourth season was released on DVD as a Shout Select title, available exclusively through Shout Factory's website and select Amazon.com sellers. The fifth and final season was released on July 16, 2013, also as a Shout Select title.

On March 10, 2015, Shout! released Hey Dude: The Complete Series on DVD as a Walmart exclusive in full screen format. It is also available through Amazon.com.

On May 9, 2017, the complete series was re-released as a general retail release.

On March 24, 2021, the series (with the exception of "They're Back" from Season 4) was added to Paramount+.

♦—Shout! Factory Exclusives title, sold exclusively through Shout's online store

References

External links
 

1980s American teen sitcoms
1990s American teen sitcoms
1980s American comedy television series
1980s Nickelodeon original programming
1989 American television series debuts
1990s American comedy television series
1990s Nickelodeon original programming
1991 American television series endings
English-language television shows
Television series about teenagers
Television shows set in Pima County, Arizona
1980s Western (genre) television series
1990s Western (genre) television series